Farshid Esmaeili (born 23 February 1994) is an Iranian footballer who plays as a midfielder for the Iran national team.

Club career

Early career
Born in Bandar Lengeh, Esmaeili started his career with Badr Hormozgan from youth levels. In the summer 2011, he joined Fajr Sepasi U-20 and after a good season he was promoted to the first team. Esmaeili made his debut for Fajr Sepasi in a 6–1 win against Damash on 15 September 2012. He spent three years with Fajr Sepasi in Shiraz.

Esteghlal

On 5 July 2015, Esmaeili joined Iranian Pro League club Esteghlal on a three-year contract. He scored his first goal for Taj against Sepahan with a long distance shot in a 3–0 away win. Esmaeili scored a goal and assisted one during Esteghlal's 3–2 win in Tehran derby against Persepolis on 12 February 2017 and was named as best player of the match. He played regularly for Esteghlal under the management of Alireza Mansourian. Under German coach Winfried Schäfer, he was one of the most successful players in Iran, he also was selected as one of the best players and the top assists at the 2018 AFC Champions League. He finished his third season with the team with six goals and assisted 13 times in 34 games. Esmaeili made significant strides in his ability as a playmaker, also forming a formidable partnership with his teammates, the Uzbek Server Djeparov and the Senegalese Mame Thiam. He scored 6 goals and had 5 assists in 35 matches in his last season with the club. In August 2021, Esmaeili was linked to his move to rival Persepolis and an Emirati team. In October 2021, he joined Qatari side Al-Arabi as a free agent, replacing of his injured compatriot Mehrdad Mohammadi.

International career

Youth
Esmaeili was part of Iran U-20 during 2012 AFC U-19 Championship qualification, 2012 CIS Cup, 2012 AFF U-19 Youth Championship and 2012 AFC U-19 Championship.

U23
Esmaeili invited to Iran U-23 training camp by Nelo Vingada to preparation for Incheon 2014 and 2016 AFC U-22 Championship (Summer Olympic qualification). He named in Iran U23 final list for Incheon 2014.

Senior
Esmaeili was first called up to Team Melli training camp in September 2017 by Carlos Queiroz. He was invited again to the Iran in August 2021 by Dragan Skočić.

Style of play

Esmaeili is good on the ball with both feet and his direct running at players. In his early beginnings, he played as a forward, but was converted into a midfielder after moving to Fajr Sepasi. Esmaeili showed his best performance when playing as an attacking midfielder or as a winger. He played as an defensive midfielder on occasion for his ability to retrieve the ball, so Esmaeili is considered a utility player.

Career statistics

Club

International

Honours

Esteghlal
Hazfi Cup: 2017–18

Al Arabi
QFA Cup: 2022

Individual
Persian Gulf Pro League Team of the Year: 2016–17
AFC Champions League Top Assist: 2018 (5 Assist)
AFC Champions League Fans' Best XI: 2018

References

External links

Farshid Esmaeili on Instagram

Farshid Esmaeili at PersianLeague.com

1994 births
Living people
People from Hormozgan Province
Iranian footballers
Association football midfielders
 Association football utility players
Azadegan League players
Persian Gulf Pro League players
Qatar Stars League players
Fajr Sepasi players
Esteghlal F.C. players
Al-Arabi SC (Qatar) players
Iranian expatriate footballers
Expatriate footballers in Qatar
Iranian expatriate sportspeople in Qatar
Footballers at the 2014 Asian Games
Asian Games competitors for Iran